is a railway station on the Hokuriku Main Line in the city of Kaga, Ishikawa Prefecture, Japan, operated by the West Japan Railway Company (JR West).

Lines

Station layout
The station consists of one side platform and one island platform connected by a footbridge. The station has a Midori no Madoguchi staffed ticket office.

Platforms

History
The station opened on 20 September 1897. With the privatization of Japanese National Railways (JNR) on 1 April 1987, the station came under the control of JR West.

Passenger statistics
In fiscal 2015, the station was used by an average of 902 passengers daily (boarding passengers only).

Surrounding area

Kaga City Hall
Kaga Post Office

See also
 List of railway stations in Japan

References

External links

  

Railway stations in Ishikawa Prefecture
Stations of West Japan Railway Company
Railway stations in Japan opened in 1897
Hokuriku Main Line
Kaga, Ishikawa